Anna Wijk (born 20 June 1991) is a Swedish former floorball player. She was named by Innebandymagazinet as female floorball player of the year in 2014, 2015, 2016, and 2019, as well as the best female player of all time. She was part of the Swedish national team that won gold in the Women's Floorball World Championship in 2009, 2011, 2013, 2015, 2017, and 2019.

On 31 January 2022, Anna Wijk announced her retirement from floorball.

Clubs during her career 
IBK Alba (2006–2007)
Gävle GIK (2007–2008)
RIG Umeå IBF (2008–2009)
IKSU (2009–2010)
KAIS Mora IF (2010–11)

See also 

 Svenska Superligan

References

External links 
Anna Wijk at innebandy.se
Anna Wijk KAIS Mora

Swedish sportswomen
Swedish floorball players
Living people
1991 births
People from Sandviken Municipality
Sportspeople from Gävleborg County
21st-century Swedish women